Liberius (died c.200) was Bishop of Ravenna. He is regarded as the founder of the see of Ravenna and was one of its first bishops.

His memorial day is 30 December.

References

Italian saints
2nd-century Christian saints
200 deaths
2nd-century Italian bishops
Bishops of Ravenna
2nd-century Romans
Year of birth unknown